Edmund Crosse may refer to:

 Edmund Crosse, founded Crosse & Blackwell food production company with Thomas Blackwell
 Edmund Crosse (cricketer) (1882–1963), English cricketer